South Twin Lake may refer to:
South Twin Lake, Maine
South Twin Lake in Lyon County, Minnesota
South Twin Lake in Mahnomen County, Minnesota
South Twin Lake (Wisconsin)
South Twin Lake in Taylor County, Wisconsin